Veskimäe may refer to several places in Estonia:

Veskimäe, Tartu County, village in Mäksa Parish, Tartu County
Veskimäe, Viljandi County, village in Abja Parish, Viljandi County